Worksop South is an electoral ward in the district of Bassetlaw. The ward elects 3 councillors to Bassetlaw District Council using the first past the post electoral system, with each councillor serving a four-year term in office. The number of registered voters in the ward is 5,636 as of 2019.

It consists of the southern part of Worksop, including the St. Anne's Estate.

The ward was created in 2002 following a review of electoral boundaries in Bassetlaw by the Boundary Committee for England.

Councillors

The ward elects 3 councillors every four years. Prior to 2015, Bassetlaw District Council was elected by thirds with elections taking place every year except the year in which elections to Nottinghamshire County Council took place.

Elections

2019

2015

2014

2012

2011

2010 by-election
A by-election was held on 16 September 2010 due to the death of Michael Bennett (Conservative).

2010

2008

2007

2006

2004

2003

2002

References

Wards of Nottinghamshire